Jackeline Martins Petkovic (born November 10, 1980) is Brazilian model, singer, actress and television host.

Personal life 

She is of Croatian, Portuguese, Russian and German descent.

Career

As television host 
Bom Dia & Companhia (1998-2003)
Insomnia (2006-2007)

Radio 
Boa Tarde, Jacky (2009)
Papo Sério (2009)

Telenovelas 
Metamorphoses (2004)

Film 
Didi, o Cupido Trapalhão (2003)
Help! I'm a Fish - Brazilian Portuguese version (2003)
Manuelita - Brazilian Portuguese version (2002)
Jovens da lei (2010)

Discography 
Jacky, Yes! A Garota Fantasia (1998, BMG) 
O Circo Encantado da Jacky (1999, Sun Records)
Amor Virtual (2000, Sun Records)
Na Onda da Jacky (2002, Sun Records)

References

External links

1980 births
Living people
Brazilian people of Croatian descent
Brazilian people of Portuguese descent
Brazilian people of Russian descent
Brazilian people of German descent
Brazilian female models
Brazilian film actresses
Brazilian children's television presenters